The 34th People's Choice Awards, honoring the best in popular culture for 2007, were held on January 8, 2008 at the Shrine Auditorium in Los Angeles, California. They were hosted by Queen Latifah and broadcast on CBS. Unlike previous years, the ceremony was taped and winners were shown accepting their awards in pre-taped segments due to actors not wanting to cross the picket lines of the striking Writers Guild of America.

Nominations and winners
Nominees and winners were chosen by those who registered with the awards shows official website.

Awards
Winners are listed first, in bold. Other nominees are in alphabetical order.

Other awards
Crest & Scope's Spotlight Shining Smile
Yomarie T. Milwaukee, Wisconsin
Karla D. Atlanta, Georgia
Anisa I. Seattle, Washington
The winner was supposed to be "Miss People's Choice" and present the awards to the winners, but this was scrapped due to the writers strike (see top of the page).
Favorite User-Generated Video
'''"Shoes"
"Beatboxing Flute "Inspector Gadget" Remix"
"Chocolate Rain"
"Daft Hands -- Harder, Better, Faster, Stronger"
"Leave Britney Alone!"

References

People's Choice Awards
2007 awards in the United States
2008 in California